Prithvi Singh Kandhal is an American civil engineer who has been recognized internationally for his work in asphalt road construction technology.

Kandhal was inducted in August 2011 onto the "Wall of Honor" established at the National Center for Asphalt Technology (NCAT), the largest asphalt road research center in the world. In 2012 he became an Honorary Member of the Association of Asphalt Paving Technologists (AAPT).

Career in the Pennsylvania Department of Transportation 
After graduation from Iowa State, Kandhal joined the Pennsylvania Department of Transportation (PennDOT) as Chief Asphalt Engineer in 1970. There he developed a new pothole patching mix. He worked for PennDOT for 17 years.

National Center for Asphalt Technology, Auburn University, Alabama 
Kandhal joined the National Center for Asphalt Technology (NCAT) at Auburn University, Alabama, as Assistant Director in February 1988. He was instrumental in NCAT's growth into being the world's largest asphalt research center. Later he was appointed Associate Director of NCAT.

References 

American civil engineers
Living people
Iowa State University alumni
Auburn University faculty
American people of Indian descent
American businesspeople
Businesspeople from Jaipur
Indian emigrants to the United States
Year of birth missing (living people)